Puerto Heath Airport  is an airport serving the river village of Puerto Heath (es) in the La Paz Department of Bolivia.

The village is on the Madre de Dios River at its confluence with the Heath River, which is locally the border between Bolivia and Peru.

See also

Transport in Bolivia
List of airports in Bolivia

References

External links
OpenStreetMap - Puerto Heath

Airports in La Paz Department (Bolivia)